Space Zombies is the first EP by YouTube comedian Jarrod Alonge, released under the moniker of his fictitious metalcore band Amidst the Grave's Demons on June 17, 2016. The album's title is a reference to the Zombie and Space EPs by The Devil Wears Prada.

Unlike Alonge's previous albums that focused primarily on satirizing musical tropes, Space Zombies directly parodies the bands The Devil Wears Prada, A Day to Remember, Architects, and For Today. In addition to the band parodies, the EP also features an acoustic version of the song "The Swimmer" from Beating a Dead Horse, with the original song being a parody of the band Memphis May Fire.

Track listing

Personnel
Amidst the Grave's Demons
 Michael "Mike" Martenson – vocals
 Jarrod Alonge – songwriting, guitar

Additional personnel
 Jake Cemer – acoustic guitar
 Joey Sturgis – mastering
 Dylan Werle – vocal editing
 Brittain Clay – vocal editing
 Varrick Jay, Ben Drake, James Dotzler, Sam Fassler – gang vocals on "Suck My 401K"
 Chris Linck – guest guitar solo on "Suck My 401K"
 Mattie Montgomery – additional vocals on "Misogyneric"
 Johnny Franck – production, guitar, programming, clean vocals on "I'm So Scene 2.0"
 Sarah Schmidt – artwork

References

2016 debut EPs
Jarrod Alonge albums
Zombies and revenants in popular culture